Ouled EL Bahdja, is a campaign among fans of USM Alger to restore the matchday atmosphere within Virage specifically, and Omar Hamadi Stadium more generally. It was established by a group of Algiers fans from Casbah in the nineties. Their songs are chanted by all the demonstrators in the four corners of the country and even elsewhere in the world. They refuse any public appearance and any media interview. They wish to remain anonymous, as they only sing for their club USM Alger. With the advent of Groupe SERPORT, the group suffered from legal prosecutions from people from the company's surroundings because of their criticism of the management method, and it increased because of the stadium issue, where Ouled EL Bahdja insisted on returning to its stronghold, the Omar Hamadi Stadium.

Activities

Is the best encourage football clubs in Algeria Group was founded in the nineties and the only one in that period, which was recorded with a sporty character songs, as they always give great pictures in the stands on the way the supporters of Milan because of the similarity of the colors red panels and black made the group Ouled EL Bahdja make a big gap in all stadiums inside and outside the home have made many tifo in the Ligue Professionnelle 1 or in continental competitions as for Music of Ouled EL Bahdja Every masses in Algeria frequency with the change of name of the club only because of her fame that went beyond the border in Tunisia and Morocco. On June 21, 2017 in a match against Zamalek in the CAF Champions League, the supporters of the USM Alger they hoisted their biggest tifo raised them from runway 13 to runway 21 of the Stade du 5 Juillet written in which the Islamic Union in Arabic is the old name of the club Union Sportive Musulmane d'Alger

In the match against CAPS United in the 80th anniversary of the founding of the club, supporters lifted tifo from the team's past with the number 80 and in the middle of zero was placed yellow star and also with a logo written in French Ensemble and then in the 80th minute fans celebrated this time fireworks such as Smoke grenade., The Tifo of USM Alger fans against Mozambique's Ferroviário Beira (0-0) in the quarter-finals of the CAF Champions League, played at Stade du 5 Juillet, was ranked in the second place in the Top 10 of the week tifos established by the specialized site La Grinta. Tifo was written in English I will try until I die it means trying to win the first African cup. On November 16, Soolking feat Rim'K released a song Her name is Lela, some of which were filmed at Omar Hamadi Stadium with the supporters of USM Alger, Soolking is known as a big fan of The Reds and Blacks.

On December 14, 2022, Ouled EL Bahdja announced that it had stopped its activity after 15 years. Its members said that after deep thinking that lasted for several months in the interest of the club, they are withdrawing, and secondly, they are no longer able to serve USM Alger as they did before, and also the problems and harassment that befell them, and even from them. He was dragged to the courts, and the statement was concluded with the slogan, USMA will remain, EL Bahdja will remain, and history will remain.

Rivalries and friendships

Rivalries and friendships of Ouled EL Bahdja with other groups are the same of the entire sector of USM Alger supporters, the principal and the oldest rivalry is against supporters of MC Alger, the other football club in city of Algiers. Other main rivalries are against supporters of CR Belouizdad, JS Kabylie and USM El Harrach, friendship relations of the group are with few supporters groups. The only twinnage is with the ultras of CS Constantine and WA Tlemcen. and at the international level, there is good friendship with supporters of WAC Casablanca of Morocco and Espérance de Tunis from Tunisia. In the semi-final match against WAC Casablanca, the two matches were held in a high sports spirit. Despite the diplomatic relations between the two countries, it is not good but the supporters of the two teams were on time. The supporters of Wydad were received in Algeria and received free tickets to the stadium and the same was done by the WAC Casablanca in the second leg match. In the group stage meeting in 2019–20 CAF Champions League, Wydad Casablanca's captain Brahim Nekkach presented a special gift to Mohamed Lamine Zemmamouche, which was a document dating back 77 years, which is a letter that Union Sportive Musulmane Algéroise had addressed to Wydad Casablanca in 1943 inviting him to participate in a friendly tournament in Algeria and confronting him.

Accidents
On July 5, 1997, in the middle of the black decade, three USMA supporters who were celebrating the Algerian Cup won by their team are murdered in a false dam at Frais Vallon.

On 21 September 2013, two supporters of USM Alger at the match against MC Alger, died after the collapse of part of the "Stade 5 Juillet 1962". The incident and the death of supporters Azeeb Sufyan and Saif al-Din Darhoum, and injuring several hundred others in Algiers spoiled the joy of winning the Darby supporters of the Union, The drama occurred ten minutes after the end of the match. Part of the 13th of the Stade 5 Juillet 1962 collapsed. After this incident there was a plan to destroy the whole stadium, but they retreated and decided to remove only the upper terraces and renovate them completely, the local authorities decided to close the stadium, where an investigation was opened into the incident he was also sacked director of the compound Youcef Kara after that, the funeral was attended by officials of the USM Alger led by Rabouh Haddad, who conveyed condolences to the family of the deceased and their condolences.

On September 9, 2018, And in a match between USM Alger and Al-Quwa Al-Jawiya in the Arab Club Champions Cup at Omar Hamadi Stadium and in the 70th minute withdrawal of Al-Quwa Al-Jawiya's players in protest at offensive chants from spectators. after mentioning the name of the former president Saddam Hussein and anti-Shia slogans angering Baghdad, The Iraqi ministry of foreign affairs summoned Algeria's ambassador in Baghdad over "sectarian chants" made by Algerian fans Ahmed Mahjoub, Iraq's foreign affairs spokesperson, said Baghdad had expressed "the government and the people of Iraq's indignation... at the glorification of the horrible face of Saddam Hussein's deadly dictatorial regime", which was toppled in 2003 during the United States' invasion of Iraq. later, general manager Abdelhakim Serrar said that the concerns of fans if bothered the Iraqi team, I offer my apologies. The goalkeeper and captain Mohamed Lamine Zemmamouche also apologized to the Iraqi delegation for the conduct of the supporters.

Music production by Ouled EL Bahdja
Ouled EL Bahdja is considered the best in Algeria in the field of sports songs. Some of its songs were modified by fans of other clubs in Algeria because of its popularity, from 2018 the band became the leading political songs about the ruling regimeand, and the owner of the club Ali Haddad, known for his close relations with Saïd Bouteflika (brother of the President of the Republic) Abdelaziz Bouteflika. in the song ULTIMA VERBA, In which he criticized where he mentioned the clip in it Down of the state and those who built the highway, And the meaning of his company, which built it ETRHB Haddad Group, With the beginning of protests in Algeria, the protesters used the club's songs Most notably La Casa Del Mouradia and Babor Ellouh. On 14 March 2019 Algerian singer Soolking has released a song with Ouled EL Bahdja about the protests called Freedom. One week after being posted on YouTube, the clip is approaching 18 million views. On 10 June 2019 song la Liberté crossed the 100 million views.

Notable supporters

At the level of celebrities many popular singers chaâbi encourage USMAlger, most notably El Hadj M'Hamed El Anka The Grand Master of Andalusian classical music and Algerian chaâbi music was one of the biggest fans of the club, also helping the club through his revenues from concerts. Singers chaâbi, El Hachemi Guerouabi, was a famous supporter of the USM Alger and used to come many times to the stadium to watch his favorite team. also dedicated one of his songs to USMA. There are many popular chaâbi singers who support the club, such as Abdelkader Chaou and Mourad Djaafri who presented many songs for USMA. At the level of politicians, the most prominent fan was the first President of Algeria, Ahmed Ben Bella, who was a former player during the French colonialism. Where was a player in Olympique de Marseille, Ben Bella attended the first championship final in Algeria and the winner was USM Alger where handed him the championship cup, after the coup against him and placed him under house arrest by Houari Boumediene. Ben Bella was always asking about USM Alger, Ben Bella was the honorary president of the club until his death in 2012. 

Also, Mohamed Boudiaf was an Algerian political leader and one of the founders of the Revolutionary National Liberation Front (FLN) and Chairman of the High Council of State was a fan of the club. Saadi Yacef club president from, 1972 to 1975 was one of the leaders of Algeria's National Liberation Front during his country's war of independence also was honorary president until his death in 2021. Former president of the Algerian Football Federation, Mohamed Raouraoua is a fan of the club and during his tenure, Raouraoua was accused of helping USM Alger and that he was behind his achievement of titles. Soolking Algerian singer and rapper is also known as a big fan of The Reds and Blacks and collaborated with Ouled EL Bahdja in releasing the song "Liberté", which achieved great fame and exceeded 300 million views on YouTube. On November 16, 2021 Soolking released a song Her name is Lela, some of which were filmed at Omar Hamadi Stadium with the supporters of USM Alger. At the level of athletes a significant number of the most famous Algerian athletes, most notably the track and field Olympic and world champion Djabir Saïd-Guerni, Larbi Bourrada Decathlon athlete and Adlène Guedioura son of the former Algerian international striker Nacer and also the former player in the club.

El Hadj M'Hamed El Anka (chaabi singer)
El Hachemi Guerouabi (chaabi singer)
Djabir Saïd-Guerni (track and field world Champion athlete)
Abdelkader Chaou (chaabi singer)
Adlène Guedioura (footballer)
Saadi Yacef (politician)
Larbi Bourrada (Decathlon athlete)
Ahmed Ben Bella (1st President of Algeria)
Mohamed Boudiaf (Chairman of the High Council of State)
Mohamed Raouraoua (Former president of the Algerian Football Federation)
Yahia Benmabrouk (Algerian comedian and film actor)
Soolking (Algerian rapper, singer and dancer)
Mustapha Laribi (Algerian actor)
Ahmed Benaissa (Algerian actor)
Adel Amrouche (Algerian football manager)

References

External links

USM Alger
Association football supporters